Ablabesmyia infumata is a species of fly described by Edwards in 1931. No sub-species specified in Catalogue of Life.

References

Tanypodinae
Insects described in 1931